This is a list of the National Register of Historic Places listings in Mason County, Texas.

This is intended to be a complete list of properties and districts listed on the National Register of Historic Places in Mason County, Texas. There are one district and three individual properties listed on the National Register in the county. The district contains one individually listed property, one State Antiquities Landmark and several Recorded Texas Historic Landmarks.

Current listings

The locations of National Register properties and districts may be seen in a mapping service provided.

|}

See also

National Register of Historic Places listings in Texas
Recorded Texas Historic Landmarks in Mason County

External links

References

Mason County, Texas
Mason County
Buildings and structures in Mason County, Texas